Halik sa Hangin is a 2015  Filipino romantic horror and psychological thriller film, directed by Emmanuel Q. Palo and written by Enrico Santos. It stars Gerald Anderson, Julia Montes,  and JC de Vera. This was Edu Manzano's first film appearance after his special participation role in the 2003 hit comedy film Ang Tanging Ina. The film  was released on January 28, 2015, in the Philippines.

The film deals with a young woman who is brought to Baguio by her new stepfather. While she struggles with her new family and surroundings, she finds herself torn between two young men who bring passion into her life.

Plot
A few months before Mia (Julia Montes) turns 18, her father (Jett Pangan) dies. She goes to Baguio to live with her mother (Ina Raymundo), her stepfather John (Edu Manzano), and her half-brother Sam (Miguel Vergara). Mia misses her father terribly that she finds it hard to fit into her new home, despite her mother's sympathetic efforts and her half-brother's irresistible cuteness. Good thing, Mia seems to be friendly enough to have made new pals, like Alvin Paredes (JC de Vera), who, it turns out, sees her as more than a friend.

Then Mia meets a mysterious young man who suddenly appears and disappears; and he's always dressed in black leather jacket over white shirt, scarf, and denim pants whom she gets to know as Gio Brauner (Gerald Anderson). Mia is smitten by Gio's romantic gestures and protective ways. He teaches her to play the guitar, and brings her roses, and he even rescues her from bad guys, and helps her overcome her fears. She feels she has found in Gio her knight in shining armor who will rescue her from her incurable loneliness and deathly sadness.

But Mia's family and friends are alarmed that she has become secluded and deluded in her own imaginary world. In the end, she has to decide what matters most to her and where her heart truly is.

It's later revealed that Gio has been dead all along, and he is a ghost that haunts the house she's living in. Gio's jealousy over Alvin causes him to go crazy and haunt the house. Eventually, Mia agrees to go to the other side with Gio and heads back to where they first met. John and Sam head to Gio's old house to bless his ashes in order to bless Gio's spirit, but the spirits haunting the house knock John down.

Meanwhile, Mia tries to convince Gio to move on and leave them alone, saying that she will not be happy like this and he needs to move on. Gio refuses and then says that her father is with him. Still yearning for her father, Mia prepares to jump, only for Alvin to arrive stop her. Alvin tries to exorcise Gio, but he quickly takes control of the situation and starts to harm him. In tears, Mia agrees to die if it means the ones she love will not be harmed, and jumps. Thankfully, Sam manages to bless Gio's ashes in time, and Gio quickly catches Mia before she can die. Gio tells Mia he loves her before they share one final kiss as he departs to the afterlife, finally at peace.

Some time later, a garage sale is being held for Gio's old things. A woman picks up Gio's guitar and starts to play it... only for a string to break and blood appears on her face.

Cast
 Gerald Anderson as Gio Magno M. Brauner
 Julia Montes as Mia Generoso
 JC de Vera as Alvin Paredes
 Edu Manzano as John
 Ina Raymundo as Teresa
 Jett Pangan as Rene
 Jasmine Curtis Smith as Quinn Zobrado
 Boboy Garovillo as Fr. Abellera 
 Yayo Aguila as Inang 
 Miles Ocampo as Camille
 Miguel Vergara as Sam
 Jonicka Cyleen Movido as Pauline
 Minnie Aguilar as Yaya Jeng
 Markki Stroem as Edsel 
 Devon Seron as Debbie
 Maris Racal as Tetay
 Fifth Solomon as Louie
 Fourth Solomon as Lester 
 Alex Diaz as Wilmer
 Marnie Lapus as Dra. Sibeles 
 Joe Gruta as Mang Bert
 Mimi Orara as Sister Carmi

Production

Filming
It is set and filmed in Baguio. According to director Emmanuel Quindo Palo in picking Baguio as the movie's setting, he describe Baguio as overpopulated but no one can ever question the city's picturesque landscape which serves as an eye-candy for those watching Halik sa Hangin. Several scenes from the film were also shot in a 1930s abandoned American house and at the supposedly haunted Diplomat Hotel, both located in Baguio.

Reception

Critical response
The Filipino Scribe gave the film a rate of 3.5 out of 5.0 praising Manzano and Raymundo for their performances, saying, “Edu Manzano and Ina Raymundo only had limited exposure in the movie, but they portrayed their respective roles as a loving mom and a strict but perpetually-concerned stepfather rather convincingly.”

Jocelyn Valle of PEP.ph commended Montes' performance, stating, "Julia, the actress, shows great commitment and earnestness in playing the character of Mia. She makes the viewer feel Mia’s emotional stages of entering into the territory of romantic love — apprehension, excitement, caution, bliss — until reality bites. She shines the brightest in the pivotal scene where Mia is suspected to becoming a mental case, and Mia has to convince everybody that she’s telling the truth."

Accolades

See also
 List of ghost films

References

External links 
 

2015 films
Philippine ghost films
Philippine romantic horror films
Philippine mystery films
Philippine thriller films
2010s romance films
2010s thriller films
Gothic horror films
2010s Tagalog-language films
Star Cinema films
Star Cinema drama films
2010s romantic thriller films
2010s supernatural horror films
2015 horror films
2010s English-language films
Films directed by Emmanuel Quindo Palo